Revolutionary Workers Headquarters (RWH) was a U.S. Marxist-Leninist organization that formed out of a split from the Revolutionary Communist Party (RCP) in 1977. After Mao Zedong, leader of the Communist Party of China, died in 1976, the majority of the RCP's leadership criticized the post-Mao Chinese leadership as "revisionist" and "capitalist-roaders", saying that China was no longer a socialist country.

A sizable minority of the RCP believed China was still a socialist country, and continued to support the post-Mao Chinese Communist Party under new leader Hua Guofeng. They left the RCP to form the RWH. Aside from differences on how to assess the changes in China, the RWH also criticized the RCP for ultra-leftism, or left-idealism in their approach to political work in the U.S. After leaving the RCP, the RWH also did an extensive critique of the RCP's line on the national question, criticizing the RCP for being "white chauvinist".

The RWH published this critique in a lengthy pamphlet titled Build the Black Liberation Movement, which itself was subsequently criticized by Amiri Baraka of the League of Revolutionary Struggle in a pamphlet titled RWH on the BLM: Wrong Again! as having white chauvinist errors.  The RWH made efforts to unite in the early 1980s with the Communist Party (Marxist-Leninist), but then the CP(M-L) dissolved. In 1985, the RWH merged with the Proletarian Unity League and the Organization for Revolutionary Unity to form the Freedom Road Socialist Organization.

During its brief existence, RWH cadre were active in various movements, including the labor movement, struggles of oppressed nationalities, the women's movement, the student movement, the struggle for divestiture from companies doing business in then-apartheid dominated South Africa, and others.  Through its cadres who worked in the Revolutionary Student Brigade, the RWH was directly involved with the founding of the Progressive Student Network.

Initially, RWH activity was almost exclusively found in urban areas of the Midwest and the East; it expanded to the West Coast when it absorbed the Bay Area Communist Union in 1979.
 
While the RWH was structured according to the principles of democratic centralism, it did not consider itself a communist party per se, but rather a "pre-party organization."

See also

New Communist Movement

Further reading 
 Revolutionary Workers Headquarters Online Archive
 Revolutionary Workers Headquarters at the Encyclopedia of Anti-Revisionism Online

References

Political parties established in 1977
Anti-revisionist organizations
Defunct Maoist organizations in the United States
1977 establishments in the United States
1985 disestablishments in the United States
Revolutionary Communist Party, USA